KMMK-LP was a low-power TV station in Sacramento, California. It signed off the air February 28, 2012, for financial reasons and never returned to the air.

References

MMK-LP
Defunct television stations in the United States 
MMK-LP